Hancock–Wirt–Caskie House, also known as The William Wirt House, is a historic home located in Richmond, Virginia. It was built in 1808–09, and is a two-story, seven-bay Federal-era brick dwelling with a hipped roof. The three bays on either side of the entrance are formed into octagonal-ended or three-sectioned bow front projections with a wooden, two-level porch arcade screening the central space. It has a central hall plan with an octagonal room on the south and a rectangular room behind and a larger single room across the hall. In 1816, William Wirt (1772–1834) purchased the house and lived there until 1818, when he moved to Washington as Attorney General of the United States under James Monroe. Formerly serving as the headquarters of the Richmond Chapter of the American Red Cross, the house is now a private residence. The last business to occupy this house was the law firm of Bowles and Bowles. The house bears a strong resemblance to Point of Honor in Lynchburg, Virginia.

It was listed on the National Register of Historic Places in 1970.

References

External links 
 Mrs. James Caskie House, 2 North Fifth Street, Richmond, Independent City, VA: 5 photos, 13 measured drawings, and 3 data pages at Historic American Buildings Survey

Historic American Buildings Survey in Virginia
Houses on the National Register of Historic Places in Virginia
Federal architecture in Virginia
Houses completed in 1809
National Register of Historic Places in Richmond, Virginia
Houses in Richmond, Virginia